Martina Plantin (1550–1616) was involved in her father's printing business from five years of age, and ran the family lace shop from the age of 17. After her father and husband had died, she was the head of the Plantin-Moretus printing business from 1610 to 1614, with daily operations managed by her sons Balthasar and Jan. She was considered a "formidable businesswoman from the wealthy bourgeoisie" and the head of the Plantin-Moretus printing dynasty, by marrying Jan Moretus and being the daughter of publisher Christophe Plantin.

Early life and education
Plantin was the second daughter of the publisher Christophe Plantin and Jeanne Rivière. Born in 1550, her birth followed her parents move from France to Antwerp in 1548 or 1549. The Plantins had five daughters: Margareta, Martina, Catharina, Magdalena and Henrica. There were two sons who did not survive through infancy.

She learned to read and write at a young age, possibly both French and Dutch, and may have been taught the basics of Latin, Greek, and Hebrew languages. Her father planned the lessons for his daughters so that they would be skilled at managing households and businesses. He tailored the training for each daughter depending upon her strengths and capabilities. For instance, one of his daughters had been apprenticed to be an engraver, until she began to lose her sight. Christoper Plantin's daughters were expected to work in the family's businesses. By the age of five, Plantin corrected printed texts in the print shop. She ran the family's lace business beginning in 1567, when she was seventeen years of age. She continued to work there after she was married and ceased working at the lace shop in 1573.

The Plantin daughters do not appear to have been unique. Of 16th-century women from the Netherlands, Lodovico Guicciardini stated in his book Descrittione di tutti i Paesi Bassi:

Marriage and printing career
In 1570, she married Jan Moretus (1542–1610), who worked for her father beginning in 1557, at 14 years of age. Plantin's father and husband ran the printing business on an industrial scale, which was revolutionary at the time. The business reached its peak between 1574 and 1576. With 80 employees and 22 printing presses, it was the largest printing business in the world,  however its success dwindled significantly to 16 employees and four presses by the time of Christophe Plantin's death. There were two printing shops, one in Antwerp and another in Leiden. Moretus, who was the director and played a significant role in the success of the printing business, inherited the business, Officina Plantiniana Antwerp location after Christopher Plantin's death.

The business increased over time and had seven printing presses by the time of Moretus' death in 1610, after which Plantin was the nominal head and owner of the printing business from 1610 to 1614, when she stopped all business activities. She is one of the authors of Biblia sacra: quid in hac editione, à theologis louaniensibus praestitum sit, paulo pòst indicatur (1584 / 1590) and Catechimvs Romanvs, ex decreto Concilii Tridentini, & Pii V. Pontificis Maximi iussu primùm editus (1611).

Plantin and Moretus had five daughters and six sons. Plantin, through her marriage to Moretus, was considered to be the head of the printing dynasty that lasted for more than three centuries. Her sons, Balthasar and Jan, inherited the printing business and bookshop.

Death and memorial

Moretus died in 1610 and Plantin died six years later. They were both buried at the Cathedral of Our Lady in Antwerp. Peter Paul Rubens, who was commission by the family, painted a triptych of the Resurrection of Christ with the John the Baptist and Saint Martina, patron saints of the deceased and his wife on the side panels. At the time of their death, there were just five of their eleven children who survived their parents.

See also
 List of women printers and publishers before 1800

Notes

References 

1550 births
1616 deaths
17th-century printers
Flemish printers
Book publishers (people) of the Spanish Netherlands
17th-century businesswomen
Women printers
Women in publishing